Edward F Williams (1912–1993) was one of the leading British show jumping riders in the 1950s and 1960s, especially with his horse Pegasus.

Equestrian
In 1957, he won the Airedale Stakes, riding an Australian mare named Dumbbell, owned by Nora Oawthraw, at Odsal Stadium, Bradford. In a single trip to the United States and Canada in the same year, he won all three major Grand Prix (Harrisburg, Toronto and New York) and jumped 27 clear rounds.

Other interests
He appeared as a castaway on the BBC Radio programme Desert Island Discs on 23 January 1961.

Williams was mentioned in the House of Commons, on 28 February 1969, in a debate on Sunday trading.

Greyhound racing
After retiring from show jumping he took out a greyhound trainer's licence under the rules of the National Greyhound Racing Club. He won the 1975 BBC Television Trophy with Lizzies Girl, at (Monmore).

References

External links 
  Queen At Horse Of The Year Show At Haringey 1957 - British-Pathé newsreel including Queen Elizabeth II presenting a trophy to Williams.
 Ted Williams on Pegasus - 1963 photograph
 Memorial page

Place of birth missing
Place of death missing
British show jumping riders
1912 births
1993 deaths
British greyhound racing trainers
British male equestrians